The  are a Japanese women's softball team based in Kyoto, Kyoto. The Galaxy Stars compete in the Japan Diamond Softball League (JD.League) as a member of the league's West Division.

History
The Galaxy Stars were founded in 1986, as Miki House softball team. The team was transferred to Sagawa (current SG Holdings) in 2005.

The Japan Diamond Softball League (JD.League) was founded in 2022, and the Galaxy Stars became part of the new league as a member of the West Division.

Roster

References

External links
 
 SGH Galaxy Stars - JD.League
 

Japan Diamond Softball League
Women's softball teams in Japan
Sports teams in Kyoto Prefecture